The Goalkeeper is a 1936 Soviet sports-musical comedy film directed by Semyon Timoshenko. The screen version of novel by Lev Kassil , one of the first literary works about sport in the USSR.

Plot 
Primarily Anton Kandidov works in agricultural workб he carries watermelons on a boat across the Volga. Noticing how cleverly Anton catches and loads watermelons, he is told that he could become a goalkeeper and play football.

And Anton decides to follow the advice. On the way to the goalie glory, he is expected to win and disappoint.

During the work on the film The Goalkeeper, the film crew invited as a consultant the famous goalkeeper Nikolai Trusevich.

Cast 
 as Anton Kandidov
 Tatyana Guretskaya as Grusha		
 Lyudmila Glazova as Nastya, lab technician
 Anatoliy Goryunov as Karasik, an engineer
 Valeri Solovtsov as Bukhvostov, captain of 'Gidraer' football club
 Yakov Gudkin as Foma, 'Gidraer' inside forward
 Vladimir Kryuger as Tsvetochkin, captain of FC 'Torpedo'  
 German Erazmus as Redhead, 'Torpedo' inside forward
 Fyodor Kurikhin as 'Gidraer' supporter
 Konstantin Shchegotsky, Anton Idzkovsky, Makar Goncharenko as cameo

See also
 Goalkeeper of the Galaxy

References

External links 

1930s sports comedy films
1936 films
1936 musical comedy films
Films scored by Isaak Dunayevsky
Lenfilm films
1930s Russian-language films
Soviet association football films
Soviet black-and-white films
Soviet musical comedy films
Soviet sports comedy films